Libby Munro (born 11 November 1981) is an Australian actress.

Biography
Munro was born on a cattle station near Charleville, Queensland, before she moved with her family to a property west of Millmerran. She attended Fairholme College in Toowoomba where she became the school's drama captain. She attended The Women's College at University of Queensland and was appointed the cultural director. She appeared in many college productions, particularly of Shakespeare and Alan Ayckbourn plays. In 2004, she graduated from the Queensland University of Technology with a Bachelor of Business in Communications and in 2005 from The Performing Arts Conservatory Brisbane with an Advanced Diploma of Screen and Stage Acting. In 2008, she graduated from NIDA. In 2011, she attended The Groundlings school of improvisational comedy, the Ivana Chubbuck studios, and Film Fighting LA, all in Los Angeles.

Career

Munro worked at the Sydney Theatre Company, The Ensemble Theatre, Queensland Theatre Company and Melbourne Theatre Company. On television, she appeared in the series All Saints, Review with Myles Barlow, and Slide. Her breakthrough performance was her role of Vanda/Wanda in David Ives' play Venus in Fur for the Queensland Theatre Company in 2013. She was awarded the Matilda Award for Best Female actor in a Leading Role for her performance. Later that year, she appeared as Philippa Haymes in a theatrical adaptation of Agatha Christie's A Murder Is Announced for Mousetrap Production's Australian tour.

In 2015 Munro played the role of The Pilot in George Brant's play Grounded, a 75-minute one woman show, to similar spectacular acclaim. This performance earned her another Matilda Award for Best Female actor in a Leading Role; she dedicated this award to Carol Burns, a mentor, during the ceremony.

In 2016 Munro performed in the Pulitzer Prize winning play Disgraced by Ayad Akhtar in the role of Emily. She has been nominated for another Matilda Award for Best Female Actor in a Supporting Role.

Munro starred in the 82 minute one-shot feature film Eight, directed by Peter Blackburn. The independent film has won numerous awards at film festivals around the world including Best Film at Snowdance Filmfestival in Germany and Best Screenplay at the Independent Spirit Film Festival. Munro was featured in the "must see list of Oscar contenders" for the Atlanta Film Festival and also won Los Angeles Film Festival Best Film as well at the Jury Prize in Croatia.}}

Released in 2016 was the Zombie Western Bullets for the Dead with Munro as Jessica Dalton.

In 2017, Munro had her first Hollywood leading role as Claire Cane in the feature film Wild Woman, directed by Nicholas King. An action thriller set in the Anza-Borrego Desert State Park, Munro performed her own stunts and features predominantly as a hardened survivalist.

Munro starred in and wrote the 20 minute short film The Hunted shot in New Zealand in March 2018. She played the starring role of Violet opposite Joel Jackson.

Furthering her screenwriting ambitions, Munro graduated from Screenwriting for Feature Film at the Australian Film, Television and Radio School in Sydney in 2016.

In 2018 while living and working in Los Angeles, Munro shot the Lifetime movie Prison House in the lead role of Monica. Prison House will air nationally in the U.S. in March 2019.

Munro is set to shoot indie Horror film 'The Unsettling' in Los Angeles in February 2019.

Filmography

Film and television

Theatre

References

External links

1981 births
Living people
People from South West Queensland
Queensland University of Technology alumni
National Institute of Dramatic Art alumni
21st-century Australian actresses
Australian film actresses
Australian stage actresses
Australian television actresses